Sacred Heart Hospital may refer to:

In Ireland:
 Sacred Heart Hospital (Roscommon) 

In Malta:
 a leprosarium which existed in Fort Chambray, Gozo from 1937 to 1956

In Nigeria:
 Sacred Heart Hospital, Ogun State, Nigeria

In the United States:
 Sacred Heart Children's Hospital, Pensacola, Florida
 Sacred Heart Hospital of Pensacola, Pensacola, Florida
 Sacred Heart Women's Hospital, Pensacola, Florida
 Sacred Heart Hospital on the Emerald Coast, West Destin, Florida
 Sacred Heart Hospital, Chicago, Illinois
 Sacred Heart Hospital (Le Mars, Iowa), listed on the NRHP in Plymouth County, Iowa
 Sacred Heart Hospital, Cumberland, Maryland
 Sacred Heart Hospital (Manchester, New Hampshire)
 Sacred Heart Medical Center at RiverBend, Springfield, Oregon
 Sacred Heart Medical Center University District, Eugene, Oregon
 Sacred Heart Hospital, Allentown, Pennsylvania
 Avera Sacred Heart Hospital, Yankton, South Dakota
 Providence Sacred Heart Medical Center and Children's Hospital, Spokane, Washington
 Sacred Heart Hospital, Eau Claire, Wisconsin
 Sacred Heart Hospital, Tomahawk, Wisconsin

Fictional
Sacred Heart Hospital (Scrubs), as seen on American sitcom TV series Scrubs

See also
Sacred Heart Medical Center (disambiguation)